David González Gómez (born 2 August 1993), sometimes known as Roni, is a Spanish professional footballer who plays as a forward for  UD Logroñés.

Club career
González was born in Oviedo, Asturias, and represented Real Oviedo as a youth. He made his senior debut with the reserves on 19 December 2010, playing the last 14 minutes in a 1–1 Tercera División away draw against Real Avilés CF.

In July 2011, González moved to CD Covadonga; initially assigned back to the youth setup, he ended the season with 11 goals in only 18 first team appearances. On 29 May 2014, after scoring 13 goals, he returned to Oviedo and its B-team.

González scored a career-best 22 goals for Vetusta in 2014–15, and subsequent served loans at Segunda División B sides CD Lealtad and Caudal Deportivo. Back to the Carbayones in July 2017, he was assigned back to the B-side in the fourth tier.

On 30 August 2018, González agreed to a contract with third division side UP Langreo, after terminating his link with Oviedo. On 3 July of the following year, he moved to fellow league team UD Logroñés, and contributed with six goals in 27 appearances as the club achieved a first-ever promotion to Segunda División B.

González made his professional debut on 12 September 2020 at the age of 27, coming on as a second-half substitute for Jon Errasti in a 0–1 away loss against Sporting de Gijón.

Personal life
González was nicknamed Roni by his former Vetusta manager Iván Ania, who saw a player with physical strengths similar as of Ronaldo.

References

External links

1993 births
Living people
Footballers from Oviedo
Spanish footballers
Association football forwards
Segunda División players
Segunda División B players
Tercera División players
Real Oviedo Vetusta players
CD Covadonga players
CD Lealtad players
Caudal Deportivo footballers
UP Langreo footballers
UD Logroñés players